Schulpfontein is a coastal site near Hondeklip Bay in the Namakwa district of the Northern Cape province of South Africa. The site is approximately 95 km south-west of the town of Springbok

The significance of this locale is that it has been identified as a possible future nuclear reactor site by South African electricity utility Eskom.

Notes

Geography of the Northern Cape
Economy of the Northern Cape
South African nuclear sites